The Namurian is a stage in the regional stratigraphy of northwest Europe with an age between roughly 326 and 313 Ma (million years ago). It is a subdivision of the Carboniferous system or period and the regional Silesian series. The Namurian is named for the Belgian city and province of Namur where strata of this age occur (part of the Belgian Coal Measures). The Millstone Grit Group in the lithostratigraphy of northern England and parts of Wales is also of Namurian age.

The Namurian age lasted from 326 to 313 million years ago. It is preceded by the Visean stage/age (which corresponds to the upper Carboniferous Limestone of Great Britain) and succeeded by the Westphalian stage/age (which corresponds to the lower and middle Coal Measures of Great Britain). In the official geologic timescale of the International Commission on Stratigraphy (ICS), the Namurian straddles the boundary between the Mississippian epoch (359-318 Ma) and the Pennsylvanian epoch (318-299 Ma).

The upper part of the (regionally defined) Namurian stage corresponds to the (internationally used) Bashkirian stage whilst the lower part is assigned to the preceding Serpukhovian stage. Frequent references appear in scientific literature to a Namurian epoch or Namurian series reflecting the stage's earlier status.

References

Carboniferous geochronology
.
Mississippian geochronology
Pennsylvanian geochronology
Stratigraphy of Europe
Namur (city)
Namur (province)